Naquan Jones (born February 5, 1998) is an American football nose tackle for the Tennessee Titans of the National Football League (NFL). He played college football at Michigan State, and was signed by the Titans as an undrafted free agent following the 2021 NFL Draft.

Professional career
Jones was signed by the Tennessee Titans as an undrafted free agent on May 14, 2021, following the 2021 draft. He made his NFL debut in week four of the  season.

The Titans placed an exclusive rights tender on Jones on March 15, 2023, which he signed the following day.

References

External links
Tennessee Titans bio

1998 births
Living people
Sportspeople from Evanston, Illinois
Players of American football from Illinois
American football defensive tackles
Michigan State Spartans football players
Tennessee Titans players